Motor Trend is an American sports television network owned by Motor Trend Group, a subsidiary of Warner Bros. Discovery through its sports unit. It primarily broadcasts automotive-themed programming, including motorsports events.

It was originally founded in 2002 as Discovery HD Theater (later HD Theater), the first 24/7 high-definition basic cable network. It featured high-definition programming from its other channels. Redundant after the introduction of high-definition simulcasts for Discovery's networks, it re-launched in 2011 as Velocity—an "upscale male" network primarily featuring automotive programming. Following Discovery's acquisition of a majority stake in the magazine's publisher, it was announced that Velocity would rebrand as Motor Trend on November 23, 2018, as a brand extension of the automotive magazine Motor Trend.

As of January 2015, approximately 85.3 million American households (87.9% of households with television) receive Motor Trend.

History
The network launched nationwide in the United States on June 17, 2002, as Discovery HD Theater; and was the first 24/7 basic cable HD network in the US. The channel was rebranded to HD Theater on September 22, 2007. Programming included shows from Discovery sister networks, such as American Chopper and Animal Planet's Corwin's Quest, in addition to original programming such as Sunrise Earth (which featured footage of outdoor scenes with no narration), and history-focused titles such as When Dinosaurs Roamed America and Before We Ruled the Earth.

As Velocity 
By 2011, as high definition feeds of mainstream networks had become more common, HD Theater no longer filled a unique niche. On April 14, 2011, Discovery Communications announced that HD Theater would be re-launched as Velocity later in the year; the re-launch took place on October 4, 2011. The network focused primarily on automotive-oriented programming and other shows of interest to an "upscale male" audience.

As Motor Trend
On August 3, 2017, Discovery announced that it would contribute Velocity into a joint venture with the digital, live events, and direct-to-consumer businesses of automotive publisher TEN: The Enthusiast Network. Discovery will hold a majority stake in the venture.

In April 2018, it was announced that TEN had been renamed the Motor Trend Group, and that Velocity would rebrand to Motor Trend Network later in 2018. Co-branded with the automotive magazine Motor Trend, the rebranding is part of an effort by Discovery, following its acquisition of Scripps Networks Interactive, to focus more on direct-to-consumer offerings targeting niche topics with "passionate" audiences. Motor Trend already operates the subscription video-on-demand service Motor Trend OnDemand, and had plotted out international expansion (including a British launch of Motor Trend OnDemand in the UK in December 2017, and a forthcoming over-the-air Motor Trend television channel in Italy.

Velocity officially rebranded as Motor Trend on November 23, 2018.

International versions 
In Canada, Discovery Velocity launched on February 12, 2015. The channel was, originally, the Canadian version of Discovery HD Theater, and had been branded as Discovery World immediately prior.

In some markets, Discovery operates similarly-themed channels known as Discovery Turbo (Asia-Pacific, Latin America, UK/Ireland), DTX (Europe, except UK/Ireland), and Motor Trend (Italy), which feature a similar focus on automotive-themed programs.

Programming

As Discovery HD Theater
Before We Ruled the Earth (2003)
Dinosaur Planet (2003)
Insectia (1999-2001)
Sunrise Earth (2004-2008)
When Dinosaurs Roamed America (2001)

As Velocity/Motor Trend

Event coverage
In 2015, Motor Trend (then known as Velocity) and Discovery Channel acquired the broadcast rights to Barrett-Jackson's automobile auctions, previously held by Fox Sports. Mike Joy, Chris Jacobs, and Ray Evernham host the Barrett-Jackson Live broadcasts on the two channels.

In April 2018, it was announced that Discovery and Motor Trend Group had acquired the North American broadcast rights to the FIA World Endurance Championship, beginning with the 2018-19 "super season", also replacing Fox Sports. The first and last hours of most events are televised by Motor Trend (with the entire events streaming on Motor Trend digital platforms), and there is live flag-to-flag television coverage of the 1000 Miles of Sebring and 24 Hours of Le Mans. The broadcasts are produced by Eurosport, Discovery's pan-European sports network.

Original
All Girls Garage
American Icon: Muscle Car
Ant Anstead Master Mechanic
The Auto Firm with Alex Vega
Auto/Biography
Barrett-Jackson Live
Biggest And Baddest
Bitchin' Boot Camp 
Bitchin' Rides
Cafe Racer
Car Fix
Chasing Classic Cars
Dallas Car Sharks
Drift This
FantomWorks
Faster with Finnegan
Fastest Cars in the Dirty South
Inside West Coast Customs
Iron Resurrection starring Joe and Amanda Martin
Garage Squad
Junkyard Empire
Kings of Crash
Life Size
Mike Brewer's World of Cars
Miracle Ball
Motorhead Garage TV
MotorTrend: Working from Home
NASCAR 2020: Under Pressure
NASCAR All In: Battle for Daytona
One of a Kind
Patrick Dempsey: Racing Le Mans
Pikes Peak: On the Edge
Restoration Garage
RMD Garage
Roadkill
Saw Dogs
South Beach Classics
Speed Is The New Black
 Super Turbo Story Time
Tech Toys 360
Texas Metal
Top Gear America (Reboot)
Turn n' Burn
Unique Rides
What's In The Barn?
What's My Car Worth?
Wheels That Fail

Acquired
All Star Dealers
American Hot Rod
Car Crazy
Desert Car Kings
Destroyed in Seconds
Eurosport on Velocity
Fat and Furious
Fifth Gear
Get Out Alive
Graveyard Carz
How It's Made: Dream Cars
HowStuffWorks
I Could Do That!
Kidnap & Rescue
MotorWeek
Nature's Deadliest
Overhaulin'
Salvage Hunters: Classic Cars
Stacey David's GearZ
Some Assembly Required
Top Gear (UK)
The Detonators
UFOs Over Earth
Verminators
Weird or What?
Wheeler Dealers
Wheeler Dealers: Trading Up
World's Most Expensive Rides

References

External links

Motor Trend Group
Warner Bros. Discovery networks
Television channels and networks about cars
English-language television stations in the United States
Television channels and stations established in 2002
2002 establishments in the United States
Turner Sports